Mycophila speyeri is a species of wood midge in the family Cecidomyiidae first described by Horace Francis Barnes in 1926.

References

Further reading

 
 

Cecidomyiidae
Articles created by Qbugbot
Insects described in 1926